The 2003 SCCA ProRally Season was the 31st season of the SCCA ProRally and won by Manxman David Higgins and co-driver Daniel Barritt. Nine rounds were held but the season was overshadowed by a tragic accident at the Oregon Trail Rally in which the 2001 champion Mark Lovell and his co-driver Roger Freeman were killed. They were the second and third drives to die in the series, after Jonel Broscanc, who was killed in an accident at the 1992 Susquehannock Trail Performance Rally.

Nonetheless, the title was won by Higgins who beat Americans Lauchlin O'Sullivan and Ramana Lagemann to defend his title from 2002. Higgins is now known for winning five straight titles in SCCA ProRally's successor Rally America.
The manufacturer's title went to Mitsubishi.

Teams and Drivers

Calendar
Sno*Drift Rally won by David Higgins
Rim of the World ProRally won by David Higgins
Susquehannock Trail ProRally won by David Higgins
Pikes Peak International Hill Climb ProRally won by Mark Lovell
Oregon Trail ProRally won by David Higgins
Maine Forest Rally won by David Higgins
Ojibwe Forests Rally won by David Higgins
Wild West International ProRally won by Pasi Hagstrom
Lake Superior ProRally won by David Higgins

References

External links
 2003 Results at rallyracingnews.com

2003 in motorsport
2003 in rallying